Alfons Jēgers (1919–1999) was a Latvian football and hockey player. He is recognized as one of the greatest in the history of both of these sports in Latvia.

Biography

Jēgers came from a poor family and in the first years he played football barefoot with a "ball" made from papers and old clothes in the street. At the age of 16 he caught the attention of the trade-union football team. He soon emerged as a very talented footballer and his popularity was on the rise as he scored the single late goal in the victory for his team against the renowned Rīgas FK. In 1939 Jēgers played his single international football match for Latvia.

In 1940 when Latvian sports life was reorganized according to Soviet standards Jēgers played for Dinamo Riga with which he went on a tourney to Moscow, Kiev and Tbilisi. After German occupation Nazis sent him to Stutthof concentration camp where Jēgers caught typhus and was close to death. However, he survived and after the end of World War II he returned to both football and ice-hockey. From 1946 to 1948 he played football with Dinamo Riga, when it was merged with Daugava Rīga he became a player of Daugava. From 1950 to 1952 he was the captain of Daugava, in 1951 - the best goalscorer for the club in the Soviet Top League. Jēgers had to retire from football when after the 1952 season Daugava got relegated from the top league and in the whole season Jēgers as a forward hadn't scored a single goal.

In ice hockey Jēgers made a career only after World War II when he became a player with Dinamo Rīga. He played hockey on a professional level until 1957. Later he worked in coaching.

Latvian footballers
Latvia international footballers
Latvian ice hockey players
Soviet footballers
Soviet ice hockey players
1919 births
1999 deaths
Daugava Rīga players
Dinamo Riga players
Association footballers not categorized by position
Honoured Masters of Sport of the USSR